The New Hampshire Turnpike System is a system of  of limited-access highway,  of which are part of the National Highway System, within the U.S. state of New Hampshire.  The Turnpike System is managed by the New Hampshire Department of Transportation (NHDOT) Bureau of Turnpikes.

Historical
There were a number of turnpikes built in New Hampshire during the period of 1796 to 1830, totaling  in length. These were toll roads for horse traffic, which were built by private companies. Such early turnpikes included:
 First New Hampshire Turnpike –  from Durham to Concord, now part of U.S. Route 4.
 Second New Hampshire Turnpike – Claremont to Amherst. Parts of the route are incorporated in the current NH 31 and NH 47.
 Third New Hampshire Turnpike – from Walpole through Keene to Townsend, Massachusetts. The road followed much of what is now NH 124.
 Chester Turnpike Road – from Pembroke through Allenstown and Candia to Chester.
 Coos Turnpike Road – from Haverhill through Piermont to Warren.
 Grafton Turnpike Road – from Orford to Andover.
 Londonderry Turnpike Road – from Concord to Windham and Salem, via Londonderry. NH 28 Bypass is officially named Londonderry Turnpike.

Current
There are three limited-access highways that make up the New Hampshire Turnpike System:

The Blue Star and Spaulding Turnpikes are also known collectively as the Eastern Turnpike.

See also

New Hampshire Highway System
New Hampshire Historical Marker No. 8: Site of Piscataqua Bridge (start of First New Hampshire Turnpike)
New Hampshire Historical Marker No. 68: Toll House and Toll Gate (part of Third New Hampshire Turnpike)
New Hampshire Historical Marker No. 160: Haverhill Corner Historic District (northern terminus of Coos Turnpike)
New Hampshire Historical Marker No. 181: First New Hampshire Turnpike
New Hampshire Historical Marker No. 228: Cork Plain Bridge – Second NH Turnpike
New Hampshire Historical Marker No. 250: Pembroke Street (extension of Chester Turnpike)
New Hampshire Historical Marker No. 252: Bungtown (along Grafton Turnpike)
New Hampshire Historical Marker No. 253: Londonderry Turnpike

References

External links
 NHDOT Bureau of Turnpikes

New Hampshire highways
Toll roads in New Hampshire
Freeways in the United States
Lists of roads in New Hampshire